The Lester B. Pearson International Career Programs (LBPICP) is part of the International Department under the Lester B. Pearson School Board (LBPSB, French: Commission scolaire Lester B. Pearson) which is a Designated Learning Institution. It is one of the largest school boards on the island of Montreal and one of the nine English school boards in the province of Quebec.
The Lester B. Pearson International Career Parograms caters to the Adult and Vocational Education sector. It offers a variety of vocational programs in Accounting Studies, Computing Support, Residential & Commercial Drafting, Pastry Making, Pharmacy Technical Assistance, Food and Beverage, Professional Cooking, Retail Butchery, Dental Assistance, Assistance Nursing, etc. across six Adult & Vocational Education Centres in Montreal, Quebec. Vocational programs are recognized as Post-Secondary education by the Ministry of Immigration and Cultural Communities (MICC, French: Immigration et Communautés Culturelles Québec).

History
The Lester B. Pearson School Board is an English school board that was created in 1998 when 8 previous school boards joined.  It oversees 39 elementary schools, 12 secondary schools, 2 adult education centres and 4 vocational training centres, and 3 International Language Centres in which more than 20,000 students are enrolled and a territory from Verdun westward to the Ontario border. The Lester B. Pearson International Department opened in 2003 focusing mainly on secondary education for international students in Montreal, Quebec.  In 2011, the department branched into the Vocational Education sector.

Academics

Programs
Automobile Mechanics
Accounting Studies
Administrative Professional
Medical Secretary
Computing Support and Network
Hair Dressing
Electrolysis
Aesthetics
Residential & Commercial Drafting
Plumbing Heating
Interior Decorating and Visual Display
Installation & Repair of Telecommunication Equipment
Pastry Making
Market Fresh Cuisine
Food and Beverage
Professional Cooking
Retail Butchery
Sommellerie (Wine Tasting)
Boulangerie (Bread making)
Home Care
Pharmacy Technical Assistance
Dental Assistance
Assistance Nursing

Campuses

Main Locations

Marcus Tabachnick Pavilion

International Department Head Office and Pre-Kindergarten
244 De La Presentation
Dorval, Quebec, Canada

International Language Centre – Marcus Tabachnick Pavilion, so named in honour of the school board's former Chairman, is the head office for Lester B. Pearson's International Department, as well as the location for the International Pre-Kindergarten, a trilingual, educational program in English and French, as well as a choice of a third language: Italian, Spanish, Mandarin.

Lester B. Pearson Vocational Programs
Closed as of January 15, 2017

The Downtown Campus is the class location for the international students enrolled in the Computing Support Vocational Program. Upon successful completion of the program, graduates are conferred the Diploma of Vocational Studies (French: Diplôme d'études professionnelles, DEP), recognized by the Ministry of Education, Recreation and Sports, Quebec (MELS, French: Ministère de l'Éducation, du Loisir et du Sport du Québec).

John Killingbeck Pavilion
International Student Dormitory

The International Language Centre in Pointe-Claire was renamed the International Language Centre – John Killingbeck Pavilion, in honor of the long-time Lester B. Pearson School Board commissioner. The John Killingbeck Pavilion has dormitory space for students.

Affiliated Locations

Sources Adult and Career Centre
5080 Sources Boulevard
Pierrefonds, Quebec, Canada

Sources Adult and Career Centre located in the Riverdale High School building offers French courses as well as the following Vocational programs for Interior Decorating and visual Display, Residential and Commercial Drafting.

West Island Career Centre (W.I.C.C)
13700 Pierrefonds Boulevard
Pierrefonds, Quebec, Canada

The West Island Career Centre offers training in the fields of Accounting, Administrative Professional, Assistance in Health Care Facilities, Automobile Mechanics, among others.

Pearson Adult and Career Centre (P.A.C.C)
8310 George Street
LaSalle, Quebec, Canada

The Pearson Adult and Career Centre offers a wide variety of vocational programs, such as Food and Beverage Services, Pharmacy Technical Assistance and Administrative Professional.

Gordon Robertson Centre
240 Beaurepaire Drive
Beaconsfield, Quebec, Canada

The Gordon Robertson Beauty Academy was built in 1994 and was the first fully operational vocational centre in the West Island and is named after a long time supporter of education in the vocational sector.

Pearson Electrotechnology Centre (P.E.C)

5000 Rene-Huguet Street 
Lachine, Quebec, Canada
H8T 1M7

The Pearson Electrotechnology Centre is a public school which opened its doors in 2007. It offers the following programs in English: Heating and Plumbing, Installation and Repair of Telecommunications Equipment, Electricity and Computing Support.

P.E.C also has a program at:

Beurling Academy
6100 Champlain Blvd.
Verdun, Quebec, Canada

Riverdale Campus
5080 Sources Boulevard
Pierrefonds, Quebec, Canada

Partnerships
Lester B. Pearson School Board has formed a partnership with Edu Edge INC. wherein they will work together to market their Vocational programs to the Indian Market. Edu Edge is establishing a centre in Hyderabad, India to process and support student admissions across South Asia including India, Pakistan, Bangladesh, Nepal, Sri Lanka, Maldives and Mauritius. The Lester B. Pearson School Board has ties with 25 countries, with strong International student recruitment coming from China, India and South Korea, among many others, who come to study at LBPVC. In September 2014, board commissioners approved a 10-year agreement to partner the Lester B. Pearson School Board with the Sir Wilfrid Laurier School Board and Edu Edge.  Together they will open an international vocational health centre that will offer Pharmacy Technical Assistance and Assistance Nursing.  The centre will be located in Laval and is set to open its doors in January 2015.

See also

Ministry of Education, Recreation and Sports
Education in Quebec
List of English educational institutions in Quebec
Sir Wilfrid Laurier School Board

References

Education in Montreal